Phaeangellina is a genus of fungi in the family Helotiaceae. This is a monotypic genus, containing the single species Phaeangellina empetri.

References

Helotiaceae
Monotypic Ascomycota genera